The greater-than sign is a mathematical symbol that denotes an inequality between two values. The widely adopted form of two equal-length strokes connecting in an acute angle at the right, has been found in documents dated as far back as 1631. In mathematical writing, the greater-than sign is typically placed between two values being compared and signifies that the first number is greater than the second number. Examples of typical usage include 1.5 > 1 and 1 > −2. The less-than sign and greater-than sign always "point" to the smaller number.  Since the development of computer programming languages, the greater-than sign and the less-than sign have been repurposed for a range of uses and operations.

History
The text states " a > b  a  b (The sign of majority a > b indicates that a is greater than b)" and " a < b  a  b (The sign of minority a < b indicates that a is less than b)."

According to historian Art Johnson, while Harriot was surveying North America, he saw a Native American with a symbol that resembled the greater-than sign, in both backwards and forwards forms. Johnson says it is likely Harriot developed the two symbols from this symbol.

Computing
The 'greater-than sign'  is èncoded in ASCII as character hex 3E, decimal 62.

For use with HTML, the mnemonics  or  may also be used.

Angle brackets
The greater-than sign is sometimes used for an approximation of the  closing angle bracket, . ASCII does not have angular brackets.

Programming language
BASIC and C-family languages (including Java  and C++) use the comparison operator  to mean "greater than". In Lisp-family languages,   is a function used to mean "greater than".
In Coldfusion and Fortran, operator  means "greater than".

Double greater-than sign

The double greater-than sign, is used for an approximation of the much-greater-than sign . ASCII does not have the much greater-than sign.

The double greater-than sign is also used for an approximation of the closing guillemet, .

In Java, C, and C++, the operator  is the right-shift operator.

In Haskell, the  function is a monadic operator. It is used for sequentially composing two actions, discarding any value produced by the first. In that regard, it is like the statement sequencing operator in imperative languages, such as the semicolon in C.

In XPath the  operator returns true if the left operand follows the right operand in document order; otherwise it returns false.

Triple greater-than sign
The triple greater-than sign, is the unsigned-right-shift operator in JavaScript. Three greater-than signs form the distinctive prompt of the firmware console in MicroVAX, VAXstation, and DEC Alpha computers (known as the SRM console in the latter). This is also the default prompt of the Python interactive shell, often seen for code examples that can be executed interactively in the interpreter:
$ python
Python 3.9.2 (default, Feb 20 2021, 18:40:11) 
[GCC 10.2.0] on linux
Type "help", "copyright", "credits" or "license" for more information.
>>> print("Hello World")
Hello World
>>>

Greater-than sign with equals sign
The greater-than sign plus the equals sign, is sometimes used for an approximation of the greater than or equal to sign,  which was not included in the ASCII repertoire.

In BASIC, Lisp-family languages, and C-family languages (including Java and C++), operator  means "greater than or equal to". In Sinclair BASIC it is encoded as a single-byte code point token.

In Fortran, operator  means "greater than or equal to".

In Bourne shell and Windows PowerShell, the operator  means "greater than or equal to".

In Lua, operator means "greater than or equal to" and is used like this
x = math.random(1,9)
y = 5
if x >= y then
    print("x("..x..") is more or equal to y("..y..")")
else
    print("x("..x..") is less than y("..y..")")
end

expected output:
x(number >= 5) is more or equal to y(5)    
or    
x(number < 5) is less than y(5)

Hyphen-minus with greater-than sign
In some programming languages (for example F#), the greater-than sign is used in conjunction with a hyphen-minus to create an arrow. Arrows like these could also be used in text where other arrow symbols are unavailable.  In the R programming language, this can be used as the right assignment operator. In the C, C++, and C# programming languages, this is used as a member access operator. In Swift, it is used to indicate the return value type when defining a function (i.e., func foo() -> MyClass {...}).

Shell scripts
In Bourne shell (and many other shells), greater-than sign is used to redirect output to a file. Greater-than plus ampersand is used to redirect to a file descriptor.

Spaceship operator
 
Greater-than sign is used in the 'spaceship operator', .

HTML	
In HTML (and SGML and XML), the greater-than sign is used at the end of tags.

E-mail and Markdown
In some early e-mail systems, the greater-than sign was used to denote quotations.
The sign is also used to denote quotations in Markdown.

ECMAScript and C#
In ECMAScript and C#, the greater-than sign is used in lambda function expressions.

In ECMAScript:
const square = x => x * x;
console.log(square(5)); // 25

In C#:
Func<int, int> square = x => x * x;
Console.WriteLine(square(5)); // 25

PHP
In PHP, the greater-than sign is used in conjunction with the less-than sign as a not equal to operator. It is the same as the != operator.

$x = 5;
$y = 3;
$z = 5;

echo $x <> $y; // true
echo $x <> $z; // false

See also
Inequality (mathematics)
Less-than sign
Relational operator
Mathematical operators and symbols in Unicode
Guillemet
Material conditional

References

Typographical symbols
Mathematical symbols
Inequalities